Stadion RKS Skra (RKS Skra Stadium) is a historic football and athletics stadium in Mokotów Field, Warsaw, Poland. It is currently used mostly for rugby union matches as the home stadium of Skra Warsaw. The stadium has a capacity of 35,000 people, but has been closed since October 2019.

History

The Sports Workers' and Academic Clubs (Sportowy Klub Robotniczo-Akademicki aka ‘SKRA’) was established in 1921, with football, boxing and fencing sections. In the early 20s they were granted land and built a stadium near the Jewish Cemetery. 

During World War II it was within the Warsaw Ghetto and was the site of mass executions including at least 6,500 Jews, now commemorated by the Monument of Jews and Poles Common Martyrdom. The remains were reburied in the Warsaw Insurgents Cemetery.

Another sports club, KS Warszawianka had established facilities for football and athletics at the Mokotów Field, and this site was taken over by Skra after the war. Heavily damaged, it was completely rebuilt in 1948-53, with a horseshoe shaped stadium with a capacity for 35,000, as well as volleyball and basketball courts, tennis courts, and a training football pitch.

The stadium was designed by M. Kokozow and J. Wasilewski, a rare example of postwar Polish Modernism, built before the classicist Stalinist style was imposed in the early 50s. 

The sites were upgraded in the 60s to include  a hotel with a canteen, a doctor's office, a sauna, a gymnasium. a training stadium and a swimming pool complex. 

The Museum of Physical Culture and Tourism was moved here in 1966, relocated again in 2005 as the Sports and Tourism Museum.

Closure

After the regime change Skra, who owned the facility, was unable to maintain it. Several attempts to invite private investors in exchange for commercial space were stopped by the city of Warsaw, arguing the site could only serve sports. As a result Skra lost the freehold of its stadium in 2015.

Falling further into disrepair, the stadium was forced to close due to safety concerns in October 2019, and the seating area began to sprout weeds. The athletics track is still in use, as are the other facilities.

References

Rugby union stadiums in Poland
Sports venues in Warsaw
Stadium
Stadium
Holocaust locations in Poland

Trivia:. It's used in the Netflix serie 1983